Your Friend, Andrew WK was a reality show on MTV2 starring musician Andrew W.K.

In the show, people write letters to the white denim-clad rocker, and he answers some on the air. Letters that will not be helped by an answer are overseen by Andrew himself; he does this by traveling to wherever the letter-writer is from, and staying at their house a few days, working out the problem.

MTV original programming